A green flag has various significances.

National flags
The Flag of the Great Socialist People's Libyan Arab Jamahiriya was a plain green flag.
The Flag of Saudi Arabia has a field of green, which represents Islam.
Irish nationalism was traditionally represented with a green flag. The current flag of Ireland is a tricolour with green representing the Irish Catholics, orange representing the Irish Protestants, and white in the middle to represent peace.
The former Flag of Mauritania.
Various green-striped American flags flew during the Revolutionary War, with green representing the 'color of hope'.

Other
A green flag is part of a set of racing flags and indicates the beginning or resumption of an auto race.
The actual flags flown in parks and gardens that have received the Green Flag Award.
On rail transport in Great Britain and Ireland, green flags are sometimes used (less often than in the past) by railway guards as a signal to engine drivers that they can proceed.

See also
White flag
Red flag (disambiguation)
Action Party (Italy)

Types of flags
Flags by colour
Flag, green